Gadime e Ulët is a village in Lipjan municipality.

Notes

References 

Villages in Lipljan